The North Face is the northern side of Mount Everest. George Mallory's body was found on the North face. The  North Face is a place where one author/climber noted, "a simple slip would mean death."

Hornbein Couloir
Norton Couloir
Three Steps
Three Pinnacles

Views

Routes

Location

Above

See also
Kangshung face (East side)

References

External links

Mt. Everest Northeast Ridge Route

Mount Everest